This article lists all the captains of the India national football team.

The first India captain in their maiden international tour was Gostha Pal, organised under the control of Indian Football Association (Bengal) before the formation of All India Football Federation in 1937. The first captain to lead India in their first AIFF organised international tour was Karuna Bhattacharya, who captained India in their first international match against Australia on 3 September 1938.

The following table includes players who have captained the India national football team, along with the vice-captains and the international tournaments they led in.

 List of captains 

Captains by major tournamentsBold' indicates tournament winnersItalics'' indicates tournament hosts

References

External links
 Indian football international teams database (archived)

captains
India captains